xinmsn was an Internet portal featuring various news and entertainment information for Singapore-based users. It was launched in March 2010 as a joint venture between MediaCorp and Microsoft, and replaces the old iteration of MSN Singapore.

Since 1 April 2015, all operations on xinmsn has ceased. All operations have been moved to Toggle and relaunched MSN Singapore.

Content 
xinmsn provides various types of information and news within the context of Singapore. Some of the more well-known content provided are:
 Local, regional and world news
 Entertainment news
 Weather information
 Catch-up TV (a service that allows viewers to browse and watch certain television programmes that they have missed)
 Live radio
 "Interactive" drama (a service for viewers to view drama shows shown only on xinmsn and vote on how the plot progresses)
The site also provides some information about the respective television and radio channels owned by MediaCorp.

References

External links 
 

2010 establishments in Singapore
2015 disestablishments in Singapore
Mediacorp
xinmsn